In enzymology, a tyramine N-methyltransferase is an enzyme that catalyzes the chemical reaction

S-adenosyl-L-methionine + tyramine  S-adenosyl-L-homocysteine + N-methyltyramine

Thus, the two substrates of this enzyme are S-adenosyl methionine and tyramine, whereas its two products are S-adenosylhomocysteine and N-methyltyramine.

This enzyme belongs to the family of transferases, specifically those transferring one-carbon group methyltransferases.  The systematic name of this enzyme class is S-adenosyl-L-methionine:tyramine N-methyltransferase. Other names in common use include DIB O-methyltransferase (3,5-diiodo-4-hydroxy-benzoic acid), S-adenosyl-methionine:tyramine N-methyltransferase, and tyramine methylpherase.  This enzyme participates in tyrosine metabolism.

References

 

EC 2.1.1
Enzymes of unknown structure